Cuba Cemetery is a historic rural cemetery located at Cuba in Allegany County, New York.  It was established in 1841, and later expanded and incorporated neighboring cemeteries.  It includes 5,886 total interments as of late 2016 and remains an active burial ground. Located in the cemetery are the Gothic Revival style vault (1914) and McKee mausoleum (1875).  Another notable feature is the Green mausoleum (1925).

It was listed on the National Register of Historic Places in 2015.

References

External links
 

Cemeteries on the National Register of Historic Places in New York (state)
Gothic Revival architecture in New York (state)
1841 establishments in New York (state)
Buildings and structures in Allegany County, New York
National Register of Historic Places in Allegany County, New York